Milorad Ulemek (born 15 March 1965), also known as Milorad Luković and "Legija", is a Serbian former commander of the Serbian police special unit, the Special Operations Unit (JSO) and a former paramilitary commander, who was convicted of the assassinations of Serbian Prime Minister Zoran Đinđić and former Serbian President Ivan Stambolić. He was also convicted of conspiracy in the attempted murder of Serbian opposition leader Vuk Drašković.

Early life
Ulemek was born on 15 March 1965 in Belgrade. His father Milan was a sub-Officer in the Yugoslav People's Army, while his mother Natalija was a housewife. Ulemek grew up in New Belgrade, near the Hotel Jugoslavija.

Although he was problematic in his early teens, he finished an auto mechanic program and medicine school in Belgrade. In 1984, he became friends with Kristijan Golubović and together the two committed their first "big" robbery. Ulemek was given the nickname "Cema" from "cement". After a botched robbery in 1985, Ulemek fled to France.

Military career

French Foreign Legion
In the mid-1980s, he joined the French Foreign Legion, serving in Chad, Lebanon and Iraq. He was given the nom de guerre "Legion" (Legija) because of his military career in the Legion.

During his service and as sergeant, he did a tour in Yugoslavia as translator for the French Army. On his return, he did not come back from his leave and was considered as a deserter from the French Foreign Legion and went back into Yugoslavia when the Wars erupted in 1992.

Serb Volunteer Guard
He joined the Serb Volunteer Guard in 1992 under the control of Serbian warlord Arkan. Ulemek became one of Arkan's closest friends and a commander of the unit. He commanded the "Super Tigrovi" (Super Tigers) special unit that operated in eastern Slavonia. The unit was disbanded in April 1996, and all of its members were ordered to join the Yugoslav Army.

Red Berets
In 1996, following the dissolution of the Serb Volunteer Guard, on the request by head of the State Security Service Jovica Stanišić, Ulemek joined the re-structured JSO. The unit was famously known as the "Red Berets" for their apparel. In 1999, Ulemek became the leader of the "Red Berets", and became the official commander of "JSO SDB Serbia" in April 2001.

The Red Berets were used during Milošević's rule for special operations in Croatia, Bosnia and Herzegovina and Kosovo, as well as for the elimination of Milošević's political opponents. In April 2001, he resigned after pressure from the political leadership.

On 25 March 2003, twelve days after the assassination of Zoran Đinđić, the unit was disbanded.

Zemun Clan connection and Đinđić assassination
On 12 March 2003, some members of JSO who were connected to the notorious Zemun Clan, organized the assassination of Zoran Đinđić, with Ulemek being named the main organizer. Following the assassination, Ulemek was named the prime suspect and after 14 months of hiding, he surrendered in May 2004. Ulemek claimed that he had been hiding in his house the entire time, which made lot of controversy in public. The Đinđić murder trial was the first organised crime trial in Serbia. The trial saw widespread threats to the trial chamber, as well as witness intimidation and the murder of a witness. The first trial chamber president, Marko Kljajević, left the proceedings in August 2005. In verdict by Special Court for Organized Crime in Belgrade Presiding Judge Nata Mesarović, Đinđić's assassination was described as "a political murder, a criminal act aimed against the state", in which police officers and the mafia had joined hands to kill Đinđić and gain political power. Ulemek's deputy in the "Red Berets", Zvezdan Jovanović, was convicted of shooting Đinđić. Ulemek was sentenced to 40 years in prison for the organization of Đinđić assassination. After several trials, Ulemek was sentenced to total of 137 years in prison for his crimes.

Personal life
Ulemek has married Maja Luković in 1994 in Belgrade, with whom he has three children.

References

External links
  
 Biography of Legija (Serbian)
 Profile: Milorad Lukovic, BBC Europe, Last Updated: Monday, 3 May 2004

1968 births
Living people
Gangsters from Belgrade
Serbian soldiers
Soldiers of the French Foreign Legion
Serbian gangsters
Serbian assassins
Military personnel of the Bosnian War
People convicted of murder by Serbia
Prisoners and detainees of Serbia and Montenegro
Serbian people convicted of murder
Serbian military personnel of the Kosovo War